Taiwania, with the single living species Taiwania cryptomerioides, is a large coniferous tree in the cypress family Cupressaceae.

Etymology
Taiwania means 'from Taiwan', while Cryptomerioides means 'resembling Cryptomeria.

Taxonomy 
The genus was formerly placed in the segregate family Taxodiaceae, it is now included in the monotypic subfamily Taiwanioideae of the family Cupressaceae. It is the second most basal member of the Cupressaceae, with only Cunninghamia being more basal. Its lineage is thought to have diverged from the rest of Cupressaceae during the Middle Jurassic. The oldest fossil assignable to the genus is from the mid-Cretaceous (Albian-Cenomanian) of Alaska. Other fossils of the genus are known from the Late Cretaceous of Asia, the Eocene of Asia and North America, and the Miocene of Europe and Asia.

Range

[[File:Taiwania cryptomerioides 1.JPG|thumb|right|Taiwania cryptomerioides needle-like leaves.]]
It is native to eastern Asia, growing in the mountains of central Taiwan, and locally in southwest China (Guizhou, Hubei, Sichuan, Yunnan, Tibet) and adjoining Myanmar, and northern Vietnam. It is endangered by illegal logging for its valuable wood in many areas. It is very likely that the range was more extensive in the past before extensive felling for the wood. The populations in mainland Asia were treated as a distinct species Taiwania flousiana by some botanists, but the cited differences between these and the Taiwanese population are not consistent when a number of specimens from each area are compared.

Morphology

History
The genus is named after the island of Taiwan, from where it first became known to the botanical community in 1910.

The wood is soft, but durable and attractively spicy scented, and was in very high demand in the past, particularly for temple building and coffins. The rarity of the tree and its slow growth in plantations means legal supplies are now very scarce; the species has legal protection in China and Taiwan.Taiwania''''' is also a journal that is published by National Taiwan University.

Extraordinary specimens
In 2022 a team of researchers measured a 79.1 meters (259.5 feet) Taiwania specimen in Shei-pa National Park. The tree was growing at an elevation of 2,000m.

In 2023 a specimen was found measuring 84.1 meters in height.

References

External links

Conifers Around the World Special Report - "Taiwania Day" in Kyoto Prefectural Botanical Garden .

Cupressaceae
Monotypic conifer genera
Trees of Myanmar
Trees of China
Trees of Taiwan
Trees of Vietnam
Vulnerable plants